Uusimaa (both lit. 'new land') is a region of Finland. It borders the regions of Southwest Finland, Tavastia Proper (Kanta-Häme), Päijänne Tavastia (Päijät-Häme), and Kymenlaakso. Finland's capital and largest city, Helsinki, along with the surrounding Greater Helsinki area, are both contained in the region, and Uusimaa is Finland's most populous region. The population of Uusimaa is 1,734,000.

While predominantly Finnish-speaking, Uusimaa has the highest total number of native speakers of Swedish in Finland even at a much lower share than two other regions.

History 
The place name of Nuuksio derives from the Sami word  which means 'swan. Later Finns proper and Tavastians inhabited the area. Some place names have traces of Tavastian village names, like Konala, which likely derives from the older Tavastian village name Konhola. Estonians inhabited the region to a smaller extent, specifically for seasonal fishing.

Swedish colonisation of coastal Uusimaa started after the second crusade to Finland in the 13th century. The colonisation was part of converting pagan areas to Catholicism. Eastern Uusimaa had its first Christian Swedish colonialists earlier than the western part, which got its colonialists in one mass transfer of people to Porvoo in the 14th century. The colonisation was supported by the Swedish kingdom and the immigrants were provided with grain seeds and cattle. They also got a four-year tax exemption from the crown. All the Swedish place names of Uusimaa date back to this period.

The names Uusimaa and Nyland, meaning 'new land' in English, derived from the Swedish colonisation era. The Swedish-language name Nyland appears in the documents from the 14th century. The Finnish-language name Uusimaa appears for the first time in 1548 as Wsimaa in the first translation of the New Testament to Finnish by Mikael Agricola. Much of Uusimaa is literally new – it has risen off the Baltic sea due to post-glacial rebound.

The Finnish provinces were ceded to Imperial Russia in the War of Finland in 1809. After this, Uusimaa became the Province of Uusimaa in the old lääni system. From 1997 to 2010, Uusimaa was a part of the Province of Southern Finland. In 1994 it was divided into the regions of Uusimaa and Eastern Uusimaa, but in 2011 the two regions were merged as Uusimaa.

 Economy 
The gross domestic product (GDP) of the region was 91.2 billion € in 2018, accounting for 38.9% of Finnish economic output. GDP per capita adjusted for purchasing power was 43,500 € or 144% of the EU27 average in the same year. The GDP per employee was 120% of the EU average.

 Languages 

Uusimaa is a bilingual region, with municipalities both bilingual in Finnish and Swedish, and monolingual in Finnish. Uusimaa's coastal areas tend to be Swedish-speaking. The traditional regional dialects of Swedish are currently mostly spoken in Eastern Uusimaa, while in the rest of the Uusimaa Swedish dialect has become more standardised.

The Finnish-speaking population started to grow when the capital of the Grand Duchy of Finland was moved from Turku to Helsinki by the Emperor of Russia Alexander I in 1812, and the region attracted settlers from other parts of Finland. Helsinki's slang first evolved in the late 19th century. 7.6% of the population of the region speaks the Swedish language natively.

Due to immigration, many foreign languages are spoken in Uusimaa. 15.5% speak a foreign language as their mother tongue, the highest proportion in Finland and 58% of all foreign-language speakers in Finland. The figure was 1.1% in 1990, 3.9% in 2000, 8.0% in 2010 and 11.3% in 2015. Meanwhile, the proportion of Finnish and Swedish speakers has decreased from 87.6% and 11.3% in 1990 to 76.9% and 7.6% in 2021 respectively. On a municipal level, the highest shares of foreign speakers are in Vantaa (23.0%), Espoo (20.1%), Helsinki (17.3%) and Kerava (13.5%). The lowest share is in Pukkila (3.0%). 

The most spoken foreign languages are Russian (2.5%), Estonian (2.0%), Arabic (1.2%) and Somali (1.1%). Other languages include English, Chinese, Albanian, Persian, Kurdish, Vietnamese, Spanish, Turkish, Thai, Tagalog, German, Nepali, Bengali, French, Romanian, Urdu, Hindi, Portuguese, Ukrainian, Italian, Polish, Tamil, Bulgarian, Hungarian, Swahili, Amharic, Serbo-Croatian, Latvian, Japanese, Dutch, Uzbek and Greek, all with over 1,000 speakers.

 Health 
In late March 2020, the region of Uusimaa went into lockdown to isolated from the rest of Finland due to the global COVID-19 pandemic (2020/21).

 Regional council 
The regional council is the main governing body for the region and focuses primarily on urban planning. Like all regional councils, it is mandated by law.

 Municipalities 

The region of Uusimaa is made up of 26 municipalities, of which 13 have city status (marked in bold).

Helsinki Sub-region: 
  Espoo (Esbo)
Population: 
  Helsinki (Helsingfors)
Population: 
  Hyvinkää (Hyvinge)
Population: 
  Järvenpää (Träskända)
Population: 
  Karkkila (Högfors)
Population: 
  Kauniainen (Grankulla)
Population: 
  Kerava (Kervo)
Population: 
  Kirkkonummi (Kyrkslätt)
Population: 
  Lohja (Lojo)
Population: 
  Mäntsälä
Population: 
  Nurmijärvi
Population: 
  Pornainen (Borgnäs)
Population: 
  Sipoo (Sibbo)
Population: 
  Siuntio (Sjundeå)
Population: 
  Tuusula (Tusby)
Population: 
  Vantaa (Vanda)
Population: 
  Vihti (Vichtis)
Population: 

Loviisa Sub-region:
  Lapinjärvi (Lappträsk)
Population: 
   Loviisa (Lovisa)
Population: 
Porvoo Sub-region:
  Askola
Population: 
  Myrskylä (Mörskom)
Population: 
   Porvoo (Borgå)
Population: 
  Pukkila
Population: 
Raseborg Sub-region:
  Hanko (Hangö)
Population: 
  Ingå (Inkoo)
Population: 
   Raseborg (Raasepori)
Population: 

 Politics 
The results of the 2019 Finnish parliamentary election in Uusimaa (consisting of two constituencies, named Helsinki and Uusimaa) are:

 National Coalition Party: 21.28%
 Green League: 17.62%
 Social Democratic Party: 16.04%
 Finns Party: 14.37%
 Swedish People's Party: 7.51%
 Left Alliance: 7.42%
 Centre Party: 4.97%
 Movement Now: 4.11%
 Christian Democrats: 2.38%
 Blue Reform: 1.24%
 Seven Star Movement: 0.43%
 Other parties: 2.63%

 Heraldry 
The coat of arms of the province is Azure, a boat Or between two fesses wavy Argent (a golden boat which is a symbol for the coastal areas, and two silver wavy fesses which are the symbol for rivers.)

Uusimaa received its coat of arms at the end of the 16th century. There is an image of the coat of arms made in 1599. In 1997, the traditional coat of arms became the official coat of arms of the region.

 Media 
[[File:Hufvudstadsbladetin talo.jpg|thumb|upright|Hufvudstadsbladets building, Mannerheimintie, Helsinki]]

Newspapers 

Also two popular tabloid newspapers, Iltalehti and Ilta-Sanomat, are published there.

Radio stations 
Yle's local radio stations in the western part of the region are the Finnish-language  and Swedish-language Yle Vega Västnyland, in the Capital Region the Finnish-language  and Swedish-language Yle Vega Huvudstadsregionen, and in the eastern part the Finnish-language  (discontinued) and Swedish-language Yle Vega Östnyland.

See also 
 List of European regions by GDP

Notes

References

Further reading 

 

 

 

 

 ¨

External links 

Uusimaa Regional Council

 
Southern Finland Province
Regions of Finland